Jonathan Watts is a British journalist and the author of When a Billion Chinese Jump: How China Will Save the World - or Destroy It. He served as president of the Foreign Correspondents' Club of China from 2008-2009 and as vice president of the Foreign Correspondents' Club of Japan from 2001-2003. He is married to Brazilian journalist Eliane Brum.

Since 1996, he has reported on East Asia for The Guardian, covering the North Korean nuclear crisis, the Indian Ocean tsunami in 2004, the Sichuan earthquake, the Beijing Olympics, the Copenhagen climate conference, and developments in China's media, society and environment.

When a Billion Chinese Jump (Scribner, 2010) is an environmental travelogue from the Tibetan Plateau to Inner Mongolia via tiger farms, melting glaciers, cancer villages, science parks, coal mines, eco-cities, and a Barbie Emporium.

As the author noted, "To be in early 21st century China is to witness the climax of two hundred years of industrialisation and urbanisation, in close up, playing at fast-forward on a continent-wide screen."

In 2018, Watts was selected as a winner of the SEAL Environmental Journalism Award.

References

Living people
Year of birth missing (living people)
20th-century British journalists
21st-century British journalists